Christian Djoos (born 6 August 1994) is a Swedish professional ice hockey defenceman for EV Zug of the National League (NL). Djoos was selected by the Washington Capitals in the seventh round (195th overall) of the 2012 NHL Entry Draft. Djoos won the Stanley Cup as a member of the Capitals in 2018. He is the son of former Swedish defencemen Pär Djoos.

Playing career
Djoos made his Elitserien (now the Swedish Hockey League/ SHL) debut, playing one game with Brynäs IF during the 2011–12 season, and by the 2013–14 season, at the age of 19, he had developed into a regular SHL player for Brynäs.

He signed a three-year, entry-level contract with the Capitals on 16 May 2014.

Djoos made the Capitals opening night roster to start the 2017–18 season. In his NHL debut, on 11 October 2017, he scored his first NHL goal, and first NHL assist, with the Capitals against the Pittsburgh Penguins. Subsequently, Djoos became the first defenceman in Capitals history to score two points during his NHL debut.

In the 2019–20 season, Djoos was unable to make the Capitals opening night roster, reassigned to continue in the AHL with the Hershey Bears. In a top-pairing role, Djoos added 32 points in 42 games with Hershey, appearing in a further two scoreless games with the Capitals. With limited NHL opportunities with the Capitals at the NHL trade deadline, on 24 February 2020, Djoos was dealt to the Anaheim Ducks in exchange for Daniel Sprong.

On 6 May 2020, Djoos signed a one-year extension with the Ducks. Prior to the 2020–21 season, on 8 January 2021, Djoos was placed on waivers by the Ducks after attending training camp. The following day, he was claimed by the Detroit Red Wings. Djoos remained on the Red Wings roster for the duration of the season, recording 2 goals and 11 points through 36 regular season games.

As an impending free agent from the Red Wings, Djoos left the NHL by joining Swiss club EV Zug of the National League (NL) on a two-year deal through the 2022–23 season on 12 May 2021.

Career statistics

Regular season and playoffs

International

Awards and honors

References

External links

1994 births
Living people
Anaheim Ducks players
Brynäs IF players
Detroit Red Wings players
Ice hockey people from Gothenburg
Hershey Bears players
Stanley Cup champions
Swedish ice hockey defencemen
Washington Capitals draft picks
Washington Capitals players
EV Zug players